Flavius Jovinus (around 310-370 AD), was a Roman general and consul of the Western Roman Empire. He was of Gaulic or Germanic origin, born and buried in Durocortorum (present day Reims).

He was named Magister equitum in Gaul by emperor Julian. He  became magister militum under emperor Jovian (363-364), kept his rank under Valentinian I (364-375), and pushed back several incursions of the Alemanni such as the one in 366 in Scarponna (Dieulouard). In 367 he became consul.

Biography 
Jovinus was named Magister equitum (head of cavalry) in Gaul by emperor Julian. When in 363 emperor Jovian wants to replace him by one of his own men, Jovinus is proclaimed (emperor ???) by the legions in Gaul, but he refuses the purple and calms his troops. A grateful Jovian reinstates him as magister militum (top military commander). On three occasions in 366, he gave battle to the Allemanni that had crossed the Rhine: in Scarponna (Dieulouard), on a river(likely the Moselle), and finally at Châlons en Champagne. In 367 he became consul of the west Roman empire together with Lupicinus.

Having converted to Christianity, he lets build the church of Saint-Agricole and Saint-Vital on the location of the current Saint-Nicaise de Reims abbey church.  In this church he was buried in 370, in a white Marmara marble sarcophagus which he had brought from Italy. The sarcophagus of size  1.48m x 2.85m x 1.33m weighs approximately 2 metric tons and is decorated with a lion-hunt scene, and a scene of the dead man preparing to leave. Since 1958 it is in the musée d'archéologie de Saint-Rémi in Reims. Since 1880, the attestation of the tomb to Jovinus is disputed, however.

He is also attributed to the foundation of Joigny (Joviniacum), and Joinville.

See also
Durocortorum
Reims
Roman Gaul

References

External links

310s births
370s deaths
4th-century Gallo-Roman people
4th-century Roman consuls
Imperial Roman consuls
Magistri equitum (Roman Empire)